or  is a  long river in Norway and Sweden. The river starts south of Hof Finnskog in Solør, Norway and discharges into lake Fryken at Rottneros in Värmland, Sweden. The river passes through the municipalities of Åsnes and Grue in Innlandet county, Norway and through the municipalities of Torsby and Sunne in Värmland County in Sweden.

Rottnan used to have three waterfalls close to the mouth in Fryken. Rottnafallet was the last and tallest at  height. The waterfalls were built in 1927 for hydroelectric power. The name Rottnan comes from the old Swedish word Rotn which means "the roaring".

See also
List of rivers in Norway

References

External links
More pictures of the waterfalls. 
Pictures of the river from source to mouth.

Rottnan
Rotna
Åsnes
Grue, Norway